Nicole Pratt and Bryanne Stewart were the defending champions, but Pratt chose not to participate, and only Stewart competed that year.
Stewart partnered with Alina Jidkova, but lost in the first round to Maret Ani and Séverine Brémond.

Lindsay Davenport and Lisa Raymond won in the final 6–3, 6–1, against Angela Haynes and Mashona Washington.

Seeds

  Bethanie Mattek /  Renata Voráčová (quarterfinals)
  Alina Jidkova /  Bryanne Stewart (first round)
  Lindsay Davenport /  Lisa Raymond (champions) 
  Līga Dekmeijere /  İpek Şenoğlu (first round)

Draw

Draw

External links
Draw

Cellular South Cup - Doubles
2008 Regions Morgan Keegan Championships and the Cellular South Cup
2008 in sports in Tennessee